Ashwini Medical College Hospital is a medical college located in Solapur, Maharashtra.

The college accommodates 100 seats for MBBS undergraduate course.

References

External links
 

Medical colleges in Maharashtra
Education in Solapur
Affiliates of Maharashtra University of Health Sciences
1991 establishments in Maharashtra
Educational institutions established in 1991